Baghestan (also Romanized as Bāghestān; also known as Gījelar) is a village in Nazlu-e Shomali Rural District, Nazlu District, Urmia County, West Azerbaijan Province, Iran. At the 2006 census, its population was 309, in 82 families.

References 

Populated places in Urmia County